Der Lotterieschwede is an East German film. It was released in 1958.

External links
 

1958 films
East German films
1950s German-language films
Films set in the 1880s
Films set in Denmark
Films set in the Baltic Sea
Films set on islands
1950s German films